Priscus is one of several Catholic saints and martyrs. In the 1921 Benedictine Book of Saints there are seven figures named Priscus mentioned.

There are different feast days involved. In some confusion, he is said to be the first Bishop of Capua, a martyr of the third century, and an African bishop; but the sources have been cast into doubt, and even the century is unclear in some accounts.

March 28
The martyr was put to death in 260 under Valerian, with Malchus and Alexander.

May 9
Priscus of Nocera, first bishop of Nocera (is also distinguished from the Bishop of Capua).

May 26
Priscus, a Roman legionary officer, was put to death in 272 in France, under Aurelian.

September 1
The story of the African bishop of the fifth century cast adrift is doubted.

October 1
Priscus, Crescens, and Evagrius were martyrs, put to death in Tomi, on the Black Sea.

See also
 San Prisco

References

3rd-century Christian saints